The Great Synagogue, was a synagogue of the Jewish Community of Danzig in the city of Danzig, Germany (later Free City of Danzig, now Gdańsk, Poland). It was built in 1885–1887 on Reitbahnstraße, now Bogusławski Street. It was the largest synagogue in the city, and was demolished by the Free City authorities in May 1939.

Design
The synagogue was built in the Neo-Renaissance style on the basis of a long rectangle. It was one of the most distinctive buildings in Danzig, with its large dome, two towers and a lantern seen at night. In the middle of a front row there was a large stained glass window with the Star of David, and all spires were topped with meshed Stars of David.

The spacious interior was topped with a sail vault, from which enormous chandeliers were hung. The main chamber was located underneath the dome. The Aron Kodesh ark was on a pedestal behind a parokhet curtain in an apse. Above the ark, the tables of the Decalog were supported by two stone lions. Behind it were large organs and the choir of 100 members. The bimah was behind the pedestal.

Over 2000 people could participate in the services. In the main chamber there were two rows of benches for over 1600 people. Along the sidewalls and over the western entrance there were massive arcade galleries for over 300 women, supported by multi-sided pillars. The walls were decorated with motifs of plants, geometric symbols and Biblical verses. The entire synagogue had electric heating and lighting, relatively uncommon in the late 19th century.

History 

The synagogue was financed by the five reform communities: Altschottland (modern Stary Szkoty), Weinberg (modern Winnicka), Langfuhr (modern Wrzeszcz), Danzig-Breitgasse (modern Szeroka) and Danzig-Mattenbuden (modern Szopy). It was built by a company from Berlin, Ende & Böckmann, chosen by the city council.

It was opened with a ceremony on 15 September 1887, by the Danzig rabbi Kossman Werner, in the presence of the city council and the faithful. The scrolls of Torah were transported in from the Old Synagogue and two other synagogues (the Great Synagogue was seen as a building uniting the Danzig Jews), placed in the Aron Kodesh and the Eternal Light was lit. The first service was held on 8 December 1887.

At the beginning of the 20th century the synagogue became one of the most notable centres of Reform Judaism. A large museum of Judaism contained many rare and old items, particularly the collection of Lesser Giełdziński. Many concerts were held here, and rabbis and professors from all around the world gave lectures.

The 1920s saw the rising antisemitism and the increasing strength of the Nazi Party in Germany. Danzig was closely tied to Germany, from which it was officially separated by the Treaty of Versailles, and it became an increasingly unpleasant place for Jews, particularly after March 1933, when the local Nazi party won control of the city government. The synagogue thereafter was a target of two arson attempts. Both were stopped by a local militia formed by the local Jewish population to protect the building in concert with the Danzig police, who feared that any negligence of the attacks on Jews would lead to a Polish intervention. While the Constitution of the Free City of Danzig offered Danzig Jews greater protection than their brethren in Germany, Nazi sympathizers invaded the synagogue in August 1938 and trampled the Torah scrolls. The communities' leaders decided to safeguard some of their relics – the archives were shipped to Jerusalem, the library to Vilnius, and the museum to the United States. At the same time, mounting fiscal pressure forced the synagogue to sell the organs to Kraków, candlesticks to Warsaw, and the benches to Nowy Port. This was not enough, and in early 1939 the synagogue was sold to the senate of Danzig. On 15 April 1939, the last service was held in the building, and soon thereafter the senate took control. A banner was hung on a fence surrounding the building with the text: "Come, lovely May, and free us from the Jews". On 2 May, the Nazi-dominated government began demolishing the building.

After the German invasion of Poland on 1 September 1939, Nazi troops moved into the city, eradicating any resistance and claiming the city for Germany. During the Second World War most of the Jews of Danzig were murdered in the Holocaust. Survivors mostly left Europe to settle in Israel.

There are no realistic plans to rebuild the synagogue. Much of the site of the synagogue is vacant; part of the land is held by the new Gdańsk community, and part belongs to the Urząd Ochrony Państwa (Office for State Protection). On the rest, however, a theatre has been built. The Gdańsk Shakespeare Theatre opened in September 2014.

See also
History of Jews in Poland

References

 Żydzi na Pomorzu (Jews in Pomerania)

External links

 Wielka Synagoga, history and photos
Great Synagogue, recent pictures of the remains

Jews and Judaism in Gdańsk
Synagogues completed in 1887
Buildings and structures in Gdańsk
Former synagogues in Germany
Synagogues in Poland destroyed by Nazi Germany
Former Reform synagogues in Poland
Synagogue buildings with domes
Renaissance Revival synagogues
19th-century religious buildings and structures in Poland